Nikitin Dheer is an Indian actor who works in Hindi and Telugu language films, and television shows. He was a contestant on Fear Factor: Khatron Ke Khiladi 5.

Acting career
Dheer made his acting debut in 2008 with Ashutosh Gowariker's historical drama Jodhaa Akbar, in which he co-starred alongside Hrithik Roshan and Aishwarya Rai Bachchan, as Sharifuddin Hussain, Akbar's brother-in-law. Whilst the film earned critical appreciation and box office success, Dheer received praise for his role, with noted critic Taran Adarsh of Bollywood Hungama mentioning him as "fantastic". The same year he acted alongside Vivek Oberoi, Shriya Saran and Zayed Khan in Apoorva Lakhia's unremarkable action thriller Mission Istaanbul.

In 2011, Dheer appeared in Anees Bazmee's comedy Ready, alongside Salman Khan and Asin. The following year, he had a supporting role in Arbaaz Khan's action film Dabangg 2 alongside Salman Khan, Sonakshi Sinha and Prakash Raj. In 2013, he featured as the primary antagonist in Rohit Shetty's action comedy Chennai Express with Shahrukh Khan and Deepika Padukone. For his role as Tangaballi, a dreaded Tamil goon, Dheer was asked to gain more muscle and work on his accent. His physique in the film was received warmly; Mohar Basu noted that Dheer is "robust" although "hardly has a role enough to perform".

Personal life
Dheer is Punjabi and is the son of actor Pankaj Dheer. He married Kratika Sengar on 3 September 2014 in an arranged marriage. The couple has a daughter.

Filmography

Television

References

External links

 
 

Living people
Indian male film actors
Indian male television actors
Male actors in Hindi cinema
Male actors in Hindi television
21st-century Indian male actors
Year of birth missing (living people)
Punjabi people
Fear Factor: Khatron Ke Khiladi participants